The  is a limited-stop "Rapid" service operated by the East Japan Railway Company (JR East) as a sightseeing train along the scenic coastal Gonō Line in the north of Japan since March 1997.

Operations
Three return services run daily, with one service operating between Akita and  only, and the other two reversing at Hirosaki.

Stops
Trains stop at the following stations:

 -  -  - -  -  -  -  -  -  -  - -  -  -  -  -  -  -  -   -  -  - 

Stations in brackets are stations where not all trains stop at or stations which are only called at during certain times of the year.

 Resort Shirakami no. 4, 5, 3 and 6 do not stop at Moritake.
 Trains only stop at Senjōjiki at certain times of the year.

Rolling stock
The original KiHa 48 Aoike trainset was replaced by a new HB-E300 series hybrid DMU set, which entered service on 4 December 2010. An additional four-car HB-E300 series hybrid DMU set was built for use on Buna services from July 2016, replacing the KiHa 48 DMU set previously used. The exterior livery and interior design was overseen by Ken Okuyama Design.

 Aoike KiHa 48 4-car DMU (March 1997 – 2010)
 Buna KiHa 48 4-car DMU (since April 2003)
 Kumagera KiHa 48 4-car DMU (since March 2006)
 Aoike HB-E300 series 4-car hybrid DMU (since December 2010)
 Buna  HB-E300 series 4-car hybrid DMU (from 16 July 2016)

All cars are no-smoking, and all seats require advance seat reservations.

KiHa 48 Aoike

This was the first Resort Shirakami trainset introduced, converted from former KiHa DMU cars at JR East's Tsuchizaki Works, and entering service in March 1997. It was initially formed as a four-car set, as shown below. The end cars were built with new cab ends, while the two inner cars retained their original driving cabs. The name Aoike was added in March 2003 to distinguish it from the second Resort Shirakami ("Buna").

From March 2006, the set was reduced to three cars, as shown below, with car KiHa 48 1521 repainted and inserted into the newly created Kumagera trainset.

The end cars had large panorama windows and featured conventional unidirectional seating, with a small lounge space behind the driving cabs. The two inner cars each had eight four-person semi-open compartments.

KiHa 48 Buna

Following the popularity of the original Resort Shirakami (Aoike) trainset, a second set was built in March 2003, from former KiHa 40 DMU cars at JR East's Tsuchizaki Works, and named . This train entered service on 1 April 2003, and was initially formed as a 3-car set as shown below.

In December 2010, it was lengthened to four cars with the addition of KiHa 1543, formerly part of the original Aoike set, and formed as shown below.

The former identities of the rebuilt cars are as follows.

As with the earlier Aoike set, the end cars have large panorama windows and feature conventional 2+2 abreast unidirectional seating, with a small lounge space behind the driving cabs. The inner car has semi-open compartments with seats that can pulled out to create a flat seating space. It also included a smoking compartment.

KiHa 48 Kumagera

This was the third Resort Shirakami trainset to be built, entering service on 18 March 2006. The name Kumagera is the Japanese name for the black woodpecker, which lives in the Shirakami-Sanchi area, a World Heritage Site. This train was initially formed as a 3-car set as shown below. Car KiHa 48 1521 was originally included in the Aoike trainset.

In December 2010, it was lengthened to four cars, formed as shown below .

The former identities of the rebuilt cars are as follows.

As with the earlier trainsets, the end cars have large panorama windows, ten rows of conventional 2+2 abreast unidirectional seating, and a small lounge space behind the driving cabs. The inner car has eight semi-open compartments with seats that can pulled out to create a flat seating space.

HB-E300 series Aoike

This is a four-car hybrid DMU set, which replaced the original KiHa 48 Aoike set and entered service from 4 December 2010.

The trainset is formed as shown below.

The end cars have conventional 2+2 abreast unidirectional seating, and a small lounge space behind the driving cabs. The inner cars have semi-open compartments.

HB-E300 series Buna

This is a four-car hybrid DMU set introduced on 16 July 2016, replacing the original KiHa 48 Buna set.

The trainset is formed as shown below.

Cars 1, 2, and 4 have conventional 2+2 abreast unidirectional seating, while car 3 has semi-open compartments.

History

The Resort Shirakami service was introduced in March 1997, coinciding with the opening of the Akita Shinkansen.　It replaced the locomotive-hauled , formed of three converted 50 series coaches, which previously operated as a sightseeing train on the Gono Line.

See also
 List of named passenger trains of Japan
 Excursion train
 Joyful Train, the generic name for tourist trains in Japan

References

External links

 JR East Resort Shirakami

Named passenger trains of Japan
East Japan Railway Company
Railway services introduced in 1997
1997 establishments in Japan